Sanjaks (Modern Turkish: Sancak) were administrative divisions of the Ottoman Empire. Sanjak, and the variant spellings sandjak, sanjaq and sinjaq, are English or French transliterations of the Turkish word sancak, meaning "district", "banner" or "flag". Sanjaks were also called by the Arabic word for banner or flag:  liwa (Liwā or Liwā’).

Ottoman provinces (eyalets, later vilayets) were divided into sanjaks (also called livas) governed by sanjakbeys (also called Mutesarriff) and were further subdivided into timars (fiefs held by timariots), kadiluks (the area of responsibility of a judge, or Kadı) and zeamets (also ziam; larger timars).

The unofficial, geo-cultural region of Sandžak in Serbia and Montenegro derives  its name from the former Ottoman Sanjak of Novi Pazar.

Names
Liwa or liwā’ is an Arabic word interchangeable with the Turkish sanjak. After the fall of the Ottoman Empire in the early 20th century, the term liwa was used in the Arab countries formerly under Ottoman rule. It was gradually replaced by other terms like qadaa and mintaqah, and is now defunct. It is used occasionally in Syria to refer to the Hatay Province, ceded by the French mandate of Syria to Turkey in 1939, at which time the area was known as Liwa' Iskenderun.

Ottoman Empire

History
The first sanjaks appear to have been created by Orhan circa 1340 or earlier. These were Sultan-öyügü (later Sultan-önü), Hudavendigar-eli, Koca-eli and Karasi-eli.

The districts which made up an eyalet were known as sanjaks, each under the command of a sanjak-bey. The number of sanjaks in each eyalet varied considerably. In 1609, Ayn Ali noted that Rumelia Eyalet had 24 sanjaks, but that six of these in the Peloponnesos had been detached to form the separate Morea Eyalet. Anatolia had 14 sanjaks and the Damascus Eyalet had 11. There were, in addition, several eyalets where there was no formal division into sanjaks. These, in Ayn Ali's list were Basra and part of the Baghdad, Al-Hasa, Egypt, Tripoli, Tunis and Algiers. He adds to the list Yemen, with the note that ‘at the moment the Imams have usurped control’. These eyalets were, however, exceptional: the typical pattern was the eyalet subdivided into sanjaks. By the 16th century, these presented a rational administrative pattern of territories, based usually around the town or settlement from which the sanjak took its name, and with a population of perhaps 100,000.

However, this had not always been the case. It seems more likely that before the mid-15th century, the most important factor in determining the pattern of sanjaks was the existence of former lordships and principalities, and of areas where marcher lords had acquired territories for themselves and their followers. Some sanjaks in fact preserved the names of the dynasties that had ruled there before the Ottoman conquest.

In 1609, Ayn Ali made a note on their formal status. In listing the sanjaks in the Diyarbekir Eyalet, he notes that it had ten ‘Ottoman districts’ and, in addition, eight ‘districts of the Kurdish lords’. In these cases, when a lord died, the governorship did not go to an outsider, but to his son. In other respects, however, they resembled normal Ottoman sanjaks, in that the revenues were registered and allocated to fief holders who went to war under their lord. In addition, however, Ayn Ali noted that there were five ‘sovereign sanjaks’, which their lords disposed of ‘as private property’, and which were outside the system of provincial government. Ayn Ali records similar independent or semi-independent districts in the Çıldır Eyalet in north-eastern Turkey and, most famously, in the Van Eyalet where the Khans of Bitlis ruled independently until the 19th century. There were other areas, too, which enjoyed autonomy or semi-autonomy. In the second half of the 16th century, Kilis came under the hereditary governorship of the Janbulad family, while Adana remained under the rule of the pre-Ottoman dynasty of Ramazanoghlu. In Lebanon, Ayn Ali refers to the Druze chieftains with the note: ‘there are non-Muslim lords in the mountains.’ There were other autonomous enclaves in the Empire, whether or not they received formal recognition as sanjaks but, by the 16th century, these were exceptional.

In the 1840s, the boundaries of sanjaks were redrawn to establish equal units of comparable population and wealth. Each of these sanjaks was headed by a muhassil.

Government
Most of the sanjaks throughout the Empire were under the rule of non-hereditary appointees, who had no permanent family of territorial connections with the area.

The Sanjak was governed just as a Vilayet on a smaller scale. The Mutesarrif was appointed by Imperial decree, and represented the Vali, corresponding with the Government through him, except in some special circumstances where the Sanjak was independent, in which case the Mutesarrif corresponded directly with the Ministry of the Interior.

Occupied Enemy Territory Administration
Following the First World War, the sanjaks were used as a basis for the Occupied Enemy Territory Administration.
 OETA South, consisting of the former Ottoman sanjaks: Jerusalem Sanjak, Nablus Sanjak and Acre Sanjak, 
 OETA North (later renamed OETA West) consisting of the former Ottoman sanjaks of Beirut Sanjak, Lebanon, Latakia Sanjak and a number of sub-districts, 
 OETA East consisting of the former Ottoman Syria Vilayet and Hejaz Vilayet.

Mandate of Syria
 Alexandretta Sanjak

Notes

References

Subdivisions of the Ottoman Empire
Types of administrative division
Turkish words and phrases
Former types of subdivisions of Bosnia and Herzegovina